Points on the Curve is the second studio album by English new wave band Wang Chung, released in July 1983 by Geffen Records.

Background
Points on the Curve is Wang Chung's first studio album since changing their name from Huang Chung and switching from Arista to the Geffen Records. It reached No. 34 on the UK album charts on 21 April 1984 and No. 30 on the Billboard 200 album charts on 14 July 1984. The album features the No. 1 dance single "Dance Hall Days" and includes the hit singles: "Don't Let Go", "Don't Be My Enemy" and "Wait". The album cover was designed, and featured art direction by Barney Bubbles, who would kill himself three months after this album was released in the UK.

Track listing
All songs written and composed by Jack Hues; co-writers are noted.

Personnel
Credits are adapted from the Points on the Curve liner notes.

Musicians
 Jack Hues — lead vocals; guitar; keyboards
 Nick Feldman — bass guitar; additional vocals; guitar; keyboards
 Darren Costin — drums; additional vocals; percussion; keyboards
 Mel Collins — saxophone

Production and artwork
 Chris Hughes – producer
 Ross Cullum — producer
 Mark McGuire — assistant engineer 
 Chris Hughes — rhythm; sequencer and computer programming
 Paul Ridout — MC4 programming
 Greg Fulginiti — original LP mastering
 WCI Record Group — CDD pre-mastering
 Barney Bubbles — LP design and art director
 Brian Griffin — front cover photograph
 Paul Cox — back cover photograph
 Ronn Specer — hand tinting

Chart performance

Weekly charts

Year-end charts

References

External links
 

1984 albums
Geffen Records albums
Wang Chung (band) albums
Albums produced by Chris Hughes (musician)